The current flag of Koofur Orsi or Koonfuur Galbeed state was adopted in 2014. The first flag of South West State of Somalia was adopted in April 2002. The current flag's adoption when changed, it was the second time that it was changed that year, and the third time overall.

History

References

Flags of Somalia
2002 establishments in Somalia